The 2010 Monza Superbike World Championship round was the fifth round of the 2010 Superbike World Championship season. It took place on the weekend of May 7–9, 2010 at the Autodromo Nazionale Monza located in Monza, Italy.

Results

Superbike race 1 classification

Superbike race 2 classification

Supersport race classification

External links
 The official website of the Superbike World Championship

Monza Round
Monza Superbike